Secretary of State for the Provinces was an office in the Cabinet of Canada, active from 1867 to 1873. The office was superseded by the Minister of the Interior on May 3, 1873.

The position was responsible for managing the responsibilities and inter-governmental links between the federal government and the provincial counterparts. The post replaced that of the Secretary of State for the Colonies in Britain and that of the Provincial Secretary or Colonial Secretary within the former British colonies of British North America (see Provincial Secretary of Upper Canada, Provincial Secretary of Lower Canada, United Provinces of Canada)

Ministers

See also
 Secretary of State for the Colonies
 Provincial Secretary
 Provincial Secretary and Registrar of Ontario
 Secretary of State for Canada

References

Provinces